Yair Garbuz (born 29 September 1945) is an Israeli artist. He was director of the HaMidrasha Art School at Beit Berl College for 12 years. He is also known in Israel as an author and as a humorist.

Biography

Yair Garbuz was born in Givatayim, Mandatory Palestine. In 1962-1967, while a member of Kibbutz Kfar HaHoresh, he studied painting under Raffi Lavie. He also attended the Avni Institute of Art and Design in Tel Aviv. Since his debut in 1967, Garbuz's work has been exhibited in dozens of one-man shows and group exhibitions in Israel and abroad.

In 1973-2009, Garbuz taught at "HaMidrasha" art faculty, Beit Berl College, which he directed from 1997. He has also taught at the Avni Institute, Tel-Hai Academic College, and the Bezalel Academy of Art and Design in Jerusalem.

As of 2020, Garbuz is the Cultural Director of the Basis art school, a position he took in 2015.

In the 1970s Garbuz worked in a variety of media, from installations to artist's books containing political commentary and self-parody. He often references  other artists and employs visual and verbal jokes.

Awards and recognition
Yair Garbuz has been described as "adept in the poetics of loneliness, constantly lighting fires that signal from one mountaintop to the next an ironic wish to belong."

 for literature, awarded by the Municipality of Holon (2001)
Emet Prize (2004)

Published works
A Home in the Galilee

See also
Visual arts in Israel

References

External links 

Israeli artists
Israeli educators
1945 births
Living people
Israeli television critics